Felix C. Gotschalk (September 7, 1929 – April 20, 2002) was an American psychologist and science fiction writer with a distinct, idiosyncratic style, his work marked by energetic exploration of social and sexual taboos.

Fiction
Gotschalk was born in Richmond, Virginia.

He flourished in the 1970s, publishing mainly in anthologies such as Robert Silverberg's New Dimensions and Damon Knight's Orbit series, where the experimental energies of science fiction's New Wave persisted.  He was the author of one novel, Growing Up in Tier 3000 (Ace Books, 1975), which shares themes and a domed city setting with a number of his short stories.  During the 1980s, his stories appeared with some regularity in The Magazine of Fantasy & Science Fiction, but remain uncollected.

References

External links

1929 births
2002 deaths
American science fiction writers
Writers from Richmond, Virginia
American male short story writers
American male novelists
20th-century American novelists
20th-century American short story writers
20th-century American male writers
Novelists from Virginia